Kailey Dawn Latimer (née Farmer; born October 24, 1992) is an American professional wrestler and former softball player who is currently signed to the National Wrestling Alliance (NWA) under the name Kamille, where she is the current NWA World Women's Champion in her first reign.

Professional wrestling career

Early career (2017–2019) 
Under the ring name Kamilla Kaine, she captured her first title in her rookie year while at Platinum Pro Wrestling. There on May 19, 2017, Kaine won a seven-women Battle Royal match to become the new Diamonds Division Starlight Champion. She held the title until the following year at St. Patrick's Day Slamboree where she lost a three-way match against Dynamite DiDi and Amber Nova. She went on to work in several Florida-based promotions including REAL Pro Wrestling where on August 1, 2017 at the 2 Year Anniversary show, Kaine competed against Roxy Rouge in an unsuccessful attempt to become the new RPW Women's Champion. Kaine also wrestled in Shine, Atlanta Wrestling Entertainment and American Combat Wrestling among others during the first three years of her career.

National Wrestling Alliance (2018–present)
Kamilla Kaine made her National Wrestling Alliance (NWA) debut as Nick Aldis' insurance policy at the NWA 70th Anniversary Show on October 21, 2018 to thwart Brandi Rhodes' interference. She would maintain her presence on the NWA television by beginning to appear regularly on the first episode of Powerrr with the tweaked ring name "Kamille" to accompany Aldis on a regular basis. She presented a silent powerhouse persona to the Powerrr audience and quickly became a part of Aldis' new stable Strictly Business, which also consisted of her fiancee Thom Latimer. Kamille's first match in NWA took place on the May 12, 2020 episode of Powerrr, where she defeated Madi Maxx. At Back For The Attack, Kamille defeated Thunder Rosa to become the No.1 contender for the NWA World Women's Championship. She retained her status against Rosa in a rematch on the May 25 episode of Powerrr that ended in a time-limit draw. At the pay-per-view When Our Shadows Fall, Kamille defeated Serena Deeb to become the new NWA World Women's Champion.

Kamille made her first appearance at All Elite Wrestling (AEW) during the July 28, 2021 episode of Dynamite at attendance, where she watched The Bunny and Leyla Hirsch competing against each other to become to earn Kamille's title match at EmPowerrr, which was won by Hirsch. On August 28, at EmPowerrr, Kamille successfully retained the title over Hirsch. On the 73rd Anniversary show of NWA, day after EmPowerrr, retained her title against the winner of the NWA Women's Invitational Cup Gauntlet, Chelsea Green. During her reign, Kamille successfully defended her title against various contenders, such as Kiera Hogan, Melina and Taryn Terrell. On June 6, 2022, Kamille surpasses 365-days as champion.

Lucha Libre AAA Worldwide (2022) 
On September 17, 2022, Lucha Libre AAA Worldwide announced that Kamille will replace Thunder Rosa to challenge Taya Valkyrie for the AAA Reina de Reinas Championship at Triplemanía XXX, as she successfully defended her NWA World Women's title against Valkyire on August 27th at NWA 74. At the event, which took place on October 15th, Valkyrie retained the title.

Personal life 
Latimer lives in Clarksville, Tennessee where she used to work as a real estate agent for Blue Cord Realty. She previously dated professional wrestler Adam Scherr known in WWE as Braun Strowman as early as 2014. She is currently married to fellow professional wrestler Thom Latimer. Farmer played Division I softball at Campbell. She also played as a member of the Atlanta Steam in the Legends Football League.

Championships and accomplishments

Fitness and figure competition 
 National Physique Committee
 NPC Daytona Beach Classic Bodybuilding Championship (2020)

Professional wrestling 
 Lucha Libre AAA Worldwide
Lucha Libre World Cup: 2023 Women's division – with Deonna Purrazzo and Jordynne Grace
 National Wrestling Alliance
 NWA World Women's Championship (1 time, current)
 Platinum Pro Wrestling
 Diamonds Division Starlight Championship (1 time)
Pro Wrestling Illustrated
 Ranked No. 23 of the top 150 female wrestlers in the PWI Women's 150 in 2022
 Tried-N-True Pro
 Tried-N-True Women's Championship (1 time, current)

References

External links 

 Facebook
 Wrazzlin.com
 Campbell Lady Camels bio

1993 births
Living people
American female professional wrestlers
Sportspeople from Durham, North Carolina
21st-century American women
Legends Football League players
Softball players from North Carolina
Professional wrestlers from North Carolina
Campbell Lady Camels softball players
Fitness and figure competitors
21st-century professional wrestlers
NWA World Women's Champions